Deorikalan is a census town in Palamu district  in the state of Jharkhand, India.

Demographics
 India census, Deorikalan had a population of 3,929. Males constitute 52% of the population and females 48%. Deorikalan has an average literacy rate of 54%, lower than the national average of 59.5%: male literacy is 65% and, female literacy is 41%. In Deorikalan, 17% of the population is under 6 years of age.

References

Cities and towns in Palamu district